The Hamilton Police Service (HPS) is the police service of the City of Hamilton, Ontario, Canada. With 829 officers and 414 civilians employed under the service. It serves roughly Hamilton’s 545,000 residents.

The Hamilton Police Service has its central station at 155 King William St., Hamilton, Ontario.

The Hamilton Police Service is governed by a civilian body named the Police Services Board of Hamilton, Ontario. "It is responsible for the provision of adequate and effective police services, law enforcement and crime prevention within the City, a duty it discharges through the enactment of policies. The Board will generally determine, after consultation with the Chief of Police, objectives and priorities for the police service. The Board is responsible for the police budget, oversees the actions of the Chief of Police and is the employer for the police service." The board is composed of seven civilian members. It consists of the head of the municipal council, two members of council, three people appointed by the Lieutenant Governor in Council, and one person appointed by resolution of council.

History 

The town of Hamilton was established on February 13, 1833 by a statute of Upper Canada. It was one of the first Canadian communities to adopt the concepts of Sir Robert Peel. The first board of police elections were held on March 4, 1833.  Thomas Taylor was the first president of the board with elected members;  Colin. C. Ferrie, Ebenezer Stinson, Joseph Rolston and Peter Hamilton.

Their first meeting took place at the Hamilton Court House on March 11, 1833. The first order of business was to consider a location for a town market place. By-laws were set forth for the regulation of the town and a number of town officials were appointed. the direction of the board of police, High Bailiff John Ryckman was appointed to keep the peace, thus establishing him as Hamilton's first police officer.

In 1846 the town of Hamilton received its charter.  In 1848 Dundas created its own police agency. In 1850, the police village of Ancaster followed suit to complete the trio of area pre-confederation police departments. In August 1940, the Township of Saltfleet established a constabulary to patrol its increasingly urban territory, and in 1949, in the wake of the post-war boom, Stoney Creek did the same.

On January 1, 1974, these police forces were merged into one Hamilton-Wentworth Regional Police Force under its own board of commissioners of police. Policing was no longer a department of city hall.  On February 22, 1986, the Hamilton Harbour Police, under the jurisdiction of the Hamilton Harbour Commission, was disbanded and its function taken over by the Hamilton Wentworth Regional Police Force.

On January 1, 2001, the communities of Ancaster, Dundas, Flamborough, Glanbrook, Stoney Creek and Hamilton merged to become the new City of Hamilton. At the same time, the Hamilton Wentworth Regional Police merged to become the Hamilton Police Service.

Coat of arms, flag and logo

Hamilton Police Service coat of arms
The Hamilton Police Service coat of arms and colours, standards and guidons were granted by the Canadian Heraldic Authority (created by Her Majesty the Queen Elizabeth II on the recommendation of His Excellency the Governor General of Canada) November 15, 2007.  The coat of arms is a version of the national coat of arms for municipal police services. It may be granted to any municipal police service which is part of a municipal corporation that possesses a coat of arms by lawful grant from the Crown. All such badges share a frame of gold maple leaves rising up from a representation of the provincial flower from the province in which the service is sited, all ensigned by the Royal Crown - St. Edward’s Crown.

"On a hurt a maple leaf gules fimbriated or, all within a wreath of maple leaves or issuant from a trillium flower proper between two cinquefoils gules, the whole ensigned by the Royal Crown proper and in base a ribbon sable edged or inscribed Hamilton Police Service in letters argent;"

Symbolism

There are many symbolic meanings to various parts of the Hamilton Police Service coat of arms. The exterior frame of maple leaves, the trillium, and St. Edward’s Crown follow the traditional style of police coats of arms for a municipal police service in Canada.  The police service has the responsibility of upholding the peace and the administration of justice under the Canadian Crown.  The Royal Crown, at the top of the coat of arms, symbolizes the administration of Crown’s justice, while the laurel of maple leaves and trillium refer to Canada and Ontario respectively.  The blue field represents the harbour of the City of Hamilton and the gold edges represent the city’s industry and wealth. The red maple leaf represents Canada.  The two cinquefoils allude to the arms of the City of Hamilton in which such a cinquefoil also appears. The cinquefoil is taken from the arms of the Chief of Clan Hamilton, and it thus refers to the city's namesake.  The coat of arms is included in the Public Register of Arms, Flags and Badges of Canada.

Flag

"Per bend sinister azure and gules a bend sinister or overall the badge;"
The symbolism of this emblem is found in other elements of this record

Consecration and trooping of the colours
It was on May 12, 2008, that a special event was planned to unveil the Hamilton Police Service Grant of Arms and the consecration and trooping the colour, the service’s first police colour. The grant of arms, more commonly known as a coat of arms incorporates symbolism reflecting the years of history and heritage of the Hamilton Police Service. A ‘colour’ is the ceremonial flag, with a specific registered design, awarded to the Hamilton Police Service by Queen Elizabeth II, Queen of Canada.  In Canada this is done through the Governor General of Canada and the Canadian Heraldic Authority. The design incorporates very specific symbolic features.  To consecrate a flag is to ceremonially dedicate it to the service of the men and women, officers and civilians, of the Hamilton Police Service. The consecration making the flag a visible symbol of the years which have passed since the Service was created, and emblematic of the years to come. It is meant to serve as an inspiration for the future, and is a silent challenge to the future members to meet and exceed the achievements of those who have come before them. In a ceremony steeped in protocol and pageantry, the colour was consecrated by a drumhead service.

Logo
The logo, similar to the heraldic crest, was developed by a police committee when the Hamilton-Wentworth Regional Police became the Hamilton Police Service.  It is the logo that appears on marked patrol vehicles, signage, letterhead, etc.
 St. Edward's Crown
 ribbon containing the words Hamilton
 banner below with the words police
 within the ribbon:
 maple leaf: while representing Canada, the leaf has six facets, representing the six municipalities that formed the Hamilton-Wentworth Region (1974) and then later the amalgamated City of Hamilton (2001). Those municipalities in addition to Hamilton are Ancaster, Dundas, Flamborough, Glanbrook and Stoney Creek.
 wreath of golden maple leaves
 waves - representing the connection of the city to Lake Ontario and Hamilton Harbour

The blue oval at the top of the red maple leaf represents the Hamilton Harbour, the six veins of the red maple leaf represent the six former municipalities, the veins of the leaf extending into the blue oval illustrate inclusiveness of the community, the gold trim around the maple leaf represents the wealth of industry, natural resources, business and community partnerships, the two blue waves at the bottom of the leaf represent the vision to be the best and most progressive police service.

Police stations and other buildings in Hamilton

First jail (1817)
The first jail was built in 1817, in the present-day Jackson-Hunter-McNab area.  Up till that point, a room in the town hall was used when needed.

First courthouse (1828)
The first building related to policing in Hamilton was a courthouse which was built in 1828 and located on the east side of John Street by Main.  It consisted of two-storeys; the main one built of logs and the second of a frame construction.  The facility was used as both a court house and a jail. The building was constructed five years prior to the appointment of Samuel Ryckman, Hamilton’s first law enforcement officer in 1833.  It was used continuously until the mid-1870s, when it was deemed inadequate for the needs of the community.  Plans were then drafted for a new courthouse (1879) and a separate jail (1875).

Engine house (1836)
The engine house, which was erected in 1836, is widely accepted as Hamilton’s first police station.  It was located at 55 King William Street and was built of red brick.  Known as the "engine house", it was a combined police headquarters, jail and firehouse.  Officers on all-night duty had sleeping quarters located on the second floor, while courtroom space and the police commission offices were located on the third floor.  Officers would patrol the city until midnight when they would return to the station and remain on-call.  The building was eventually modernized and rebuilt in 1883.  Ultimately, it was incorporated into the central fire station.

No. 2 police station (1856-1929)
Located at James and Stuart Street, this station was built in 1856.  It was intended to house the two officers who were designated to patrol the north end of the city as well as to function as an engine house.  The chief’s office was added to this location during the early 1860s.  It was eventually demolished in 1929 to make room for the expansion of the Canadian National Railway Station.

MacNab and Merrick Streets Station
In the years immediately prior to 1875, a police office was situation in the Market Square at the corner of MacNab and Merrick streets.

City hall police headquarters
At some point after 1875, a police office was situated in the original city hall on James Street, which was built around 1862.  The new city hall was built on the same site in 1888 and shortly thereafter, Police headquarters moved there with offices for Magistrate Jelfs, Chief Smith and the detectives.  The police court, cells and the majority of the force were located at the King William Street Station at Mary Street, known then as number three.

Wentworth County or second court house (1879)
Planning and construction for the second court house on Main Street west of John began in 1876; however, it was not completed and opened until the fall of 1879.  As a building, it was revered for its architectural beauty, as well as its ability to adequately accommodate all the needs of the criminal justice system.  It remained in full use until the 1930s, when it was apparent that it was becoming increasingly unable to facilitate the expanding caseload.  Renovations were done to partition the existing courtrooms in order to double their number.  The courthouse eventually became too old and structurally inadequate and was set for demolition in 1956.
The current courthouse at Main and John streets was in use until 1999. Other court spaces exist in other buildings according to specific needs; for example, the creation of the unified family court in the old public library building.

John Sopinka Court House (1999-present)
In 1999, a new courthouse in downtown Hamilton was named after Supreme Court Justice John Sopinka. The John Sopinka Court House has 23 courtrooms, accommodating Hamilton's civil, criminal, POA and small claims courts. The government of Canada had purchased and renovated the Dominion Public Building for an estimated $64 million. The building was erected in 1935-36 and served as the main post office until 1991.

Wentworth County Jail (1879)
The jail was constructed at the same time as the second courthouse, and was built as the "Wentworth County Jail".  It became commonly known as the Barton Street Jail because of its location on Barton Street. It was torn down in 1978 and the Hamilton-Wentworth Detention Centre was built on site.  It was located between Ferguson Avenue North and Elgin Street, on what is presently Barton Street.  At the time, the facility housed both male and female prisoners. Half of the prisoners were incarcerated on offenses related to alcohol abuse.  In the early 1900s, the jail was housing prisoners of all types, from those awaiting a court appearance on relatively minor charges to condemned murderers.  The jail was also the location executions took place until the last execution was carried out in February 1953. Eventually, overcrowding and deteriorating conditions such as poor ventilation and physical decay demanded the construction of a new facility.  In 1978, after 103 years, the jail was demolished, and the present facility, the Hamilton-Wentworth Detention Centre was built on the same site.

Old central station "Number 3" (1870-1910, 1910-1930, 1930-1977)
Since 1870, central station, which also housed a courtroom, had been located at King William on the west side of Mary Street.  It remained in use until 1910, when it was replaced by a smaller building.  In 1930, a new central station was built. Like its predecessor, the new building contained a police court room.  It retained its dual role until 1966, when the court was relocated to the new Terminal Towers building on Main Street, east of Catherine.  The station remained in operation and served as regional headquarters until 1977 when police operations were moved to the current headquarters building across Mary Street at 155 King William Street.

Number "four" station (ca. 1884)
The number four police station was situated on Napier Street near Bay.  It was opened some time after patrol wagons were introduced in 1884.  Prior to the opening of this station, the first patrol wagon was kept at George Mathew’s livery stable on Market Street.  When the Napier Street Station was opened, two patrol wagons, and later an ambulance, operated from this point on 24-hour call.
The patrols were moved from this station in 1907, to the north building of the central police station.  The Napier Street Station was used a police office for a number of years later.  Chief Smith’s standing orders refer to in 1913 and again in 1914, and Chief Whatley’s orders again in 1917.  It doubled as the city pound around 1913.  One of the horse stalls was used to shelter animals found wandering on the streets.

Sherman Avenue Station (1911)
Sherman Avenue Station which became commonly referred to as No. 4 station, is of particular importance, as it was the first station to illustrate the city’s growth through the need for a more substantial police presence.  Since the police force was having great difficulty in keeping up with the growing population in the eastern end of the city, construction of this station was seen as a necessity.  With the city bounds expanding and widespread alcohol-related problems in the community, Sherman Avenue Station symbolized the need for police presence within the community.  The station served as headquarters for the motorcycle units from the early 1920s through to the 1960s. It was there that the need for the force to be motorized was emphasized.
It was also a model for the necessity of constructing smaller stations.  Within 14 years, several sub-stations were built to accommodate the growing community needs.
Examples of this trend are the creation of the former Kenilworth (1952) and Mountain stations (December 20, 1956). The smaller communities such as Ancaster, Dundas, Waterdown, and Stoney Creek also demonstrated a need to formally establish a police presence in their communities.  The Sherman Avenue Station remained an active patrol station until regionalization in 1974. From 1974 to 1977, it was the location of the youth branch. It has since been demolished. It also housed the police licensing bureau and the police minor sports.

Hamilton Harbour Commission Police (ca 1950) presently marine unit
17 Discovery Drive, Hamilton:
This building original housed the Hamilton Harbour Police and is now home to the Hamilton Police Service Marine Unit.  It is strategically located in the Hamilton Harbour allowing for police vessels to respond quickly to emergencies in the harbour or on Lake Ontario.
In 2014 it also became home to the Hamilton Police Service Canine Unit.

Mountain Station – Station 30 (December 20, 1956- December 2003)
The original Mountain Station located at 488 Upper Wellington St, was built to address the urban sprawl of the City of Hamilton as it grew south from the edge of the escarpment.  Over the years, much of the "rural area" was developed for residential and commercial use and this station met the needs of the growing population "above the shelf".

Dundas - Station 31 (1993-1997)
2 King St W, Dundas
Hamilton-Wentworth Police briefly established a fully staffed station in Dundas to meet the needs of  the communities of Dundas, Flamborough and Waterdown.  Police paid $186,000 a year for the building that included 55 officers, including divisional detectives, and was home to the service’s canine unit.  However, due to a lack of funding, this station was downsized into a community policing centre which occupies the main floor.  There is a current proposal to renovate the second floor into condominiums.

Central Station (headquarters) – Station 10 (1977-present)
155 King William St., Hamilton
Officially opened on July 5, 1977, this building currently serves as the police service headquarters. It also serves as divisional headquarters (Station 10 or Central Station).
Central Station has over 360 rooms used for everything from administration to holding cells. It houses the corporate, investigative and support services divisions of the Hamilton Police Service as well as division one patrol. Division one provides policing services from Sherman Ave (to the east), Main St W (Dundas border to the west), the escarpment (to the south), the Cootes Paradise of the Burlington Bay (to the north).
It houses all the other amenities necessary to accommodate the evolution of the community and policing such as a gym, pistol range, and vehicle garage.

East End Station– Station 20 (1992 - present)
2825 King St E., Hamilton
Division two provides policing services from Sherman Avenue on the west to the east border of Stoney Creek, and north from the mountain brow to Lake Ontario.
The station houses a patrol division as well as a criminal investigations division.  It formerly held the Use of Force Training Centre for Hamilton Police.

Mountain Station – Station 30 (2003 - present)

400 Rymal Rd E., Hamilton
Division three provides policing services to five communities namely Flamborough, Dundas, Ancaster, Binbrook/Glanbrook and the Hamilton Mountain.  This equates to 49.9 percent of the total population of the City of Hamilton.
Division three houses a patrol division and a criminal investigations division as well as detectives from the Hamilton Police Major Fraud Branch, technical crime branch and the B.E.A.R. (break, enter, auto theft and robbery) Unit.

Multi-Agency Training Academy (2011 – present)
1227 Stonechurch Rd E, Hamilton:

The facility consists of the following:
	A three-storey multi-agency building which houses the administration offices for the fire and EMS departments; the fire department’s emergency communications centre; the city’s emergency operations centre; an EMS training area; and police professional standards office and police training classrooms
	A working fire station at the entrance to the grounds
	Propane-fuelled props for firefighter training
	A four-storey burn building and two and half storey burn house
	A large indoor training facility that hosts a four-storey apartment building and a two-storey house in addition to locker rooms, an SCBA compressor room, kitchen/common room, classrooms, apparatus storage with in-floor exhaust extraction and traditional firefighter poles which allows firefighters to quickly slide to the apparatus floor from the second floor 
	A police "use of force" training facility as well as an indoor firing range

Background
In 2006, Hamilton Fire came to municipal council and made a capital funding request. However, it proved difficult to get approval for the funding request given the financial state of the city. In 2009, the city took advantage of the federal/provincial capital infrastructure program. The fire service partnered with the police and EMS departments and developed a three-way partnership which placed a strong focus on integration. They developed a business plan that was sent to all levels of government highlighting the need for a new multi-agency facility. The proposal was successful. The City of Hamilton’s entire portion of the funding came from the portion of development charges covering fire protection services. None of the cost was applied to the municipal tax levy. The facility opened in March 2011 and had its official opening on November 12, 2011.

Forensics / investigative services building
Catharine/Rebecca Sts:
As investigations of serious crime increase in scope and evidentiary requirements, the need arose to expand to a separate investigative services building.  The space at headquarters which housed forensics was too small for growing needs and the proper handling of evidence.  Thus, the police services board approved the purchase of land adjacent to police headquarters with the intent of building.  Subject to financing from federal, provincial and municipal governments, this plan is still in the approval stages.

Future
The buildings of the past have indicated the rapid growth of the police service and the community at large. However, it has become increasingly apparent that the present trend for greater police presence within the various suburban communities is of great concern. This is also why community policing centres have been established. The current centres are: the Barton St. Crime Prevention Centre located at 460 Barton St.E., Hamilton, the Dundas Community Policing Centre at 2 King St W, Dundas, and the Ancaster Community Policing Centre located at Tisdale House, 314 Wilson St E, Ancaster.  Tisdale House also houses the Hamilton Police Service Museum.

Units

Canine
The first known record of dogs being used in policing the Hamilton community was in 1878, when an old stray dog the officers named "Bob" was taken in and routinely brought on night patrol to accompany an officer named Constable Ferris on his beat.  Bob was not trained for special tasks, but often acted as a deterrent to those who had the potential to create trouble.

In 1960 the Hamilton Police Department acquired two dogs with the intent of training them for special circumstances. Hamilton Police had the second municipal canine unit in Canada.  Their names were Sandy and King.  The dogs were used for many functions which made the officers’ jobs safer and easier.  Due to their keen senses, dogs were trained to track suspects or missing persons, search buildings, and to locate weapons and bombs. They were also trained to disarm criminals threatening the life of an officer.  The dogs used as police dogs were for the most part German Shepherds. They are used because of their fierce loyalty, relatively even temperament, imposing physical presence and easy trainability.

The dogs train with a constable who is responsible for the dog both on and off the job. They live with officers' families which allows a constant relationship between the dogs and their handlers to develop.  Much of the time, the dogs are in training to maintain the skills they have acquired.  Today Hamilton Police deploy four police service dogs (PSD).  Each dog is trained in human scent detection and tracking.   PSDs are also used for drug detection, firearms and currency.  Hamilton Police also deploy a PSD for explosives detection.

Hamilton has had one PSD killed in the line of duty - PSD Troy killed February 25, 1992 (shot by a suspect during an apprehension).

Emergency response

During the 1972 Summer Olympics in Munich, West Germany, a terrorist attack was carried out against eleven Israeli Olympic team and delegation members who were killed along with a German police officer.  The attack became known as the Munich Massacre.  This attack prompted police agencies around the world to examine their capabilities in addressing such an attack of terrorism.  As a result of international incidents of hostage takings like the one in Munich, plus other firearms related incidents in Canada and abroad, Chief Gordon Torrance had been planning to form a special unit to deal with high risk situations.  The 1976 Summer Olympics were to be held in Montreal, Quebec.  From June 23 to July 3, 1976, Hamilton was to be the host of the Pre-Olympics Basketball Tournament.  Thirteen countries would be represented at that tournament, including Israel.  The Munich Massacre was still fresh on the minds of those planning security for this event.

In September 1975, the chief issued a policy and procedure to deal with armed and barricaded persons.  On Monday, November 3, 1975, Paul Lariviere of Champlain St., Hamilton, exchanged gunfire with Hamilton Police from his residence.  An officer who had a revolver eventually killed him.  Lariviere was found to have two rifles in his apartment.  This incident was a catalyst for the Hamilton Police Service to form a specialized unit.  On November 8, 1975, a decision was made by Chief Torrance to form a tactical unit that would begin training in January 1976.  The unit was to be based on the concept of the New York City Police Department SWAT. The unit was known as "TEAM" which stood for  ‘tactical emergency assault men’.

The mandate of the TEAM was to attain a peaceful ending to police calls involving hostage-taking, gun and other weapon-related incidents. Five TEAM officers were initially sent to the Anti-Sniper and Survival School at the FBI Academy in Quantico, Virginia.  They also took on the responsibility of explosives disposal (EDU) and received this training through the Royal Canadian Mounted Police.  The fifteen-man unit became operational on June 13, 1976. When the first female officer became a member of the unit, the name was changed to the emergency response unit (ERU).  ERU members are trained to handle a variety of weapons, deal with dangerous, high-risk situations, and are utilized when entering a premises for the execution of search warrants.

Action team

The action team was made possible through funding obtained from the Ministry of Community Safety and Correctional Services under the Provincial Anti-Violence Intervention Strategy (PAVIS). The PAVIS aims to reduce illegal gang, drug and weapons activities in communities by focusing on intervention, prevention, enforcement and community mobilization.

The action teams consist of teams of officers who are deployed on foot and bicycle patrol. The officers are deployed based on an ongoing analysis of locations, crime trends, and offenders which help ensure that the action teams are in the right areas at the right times.

Hot spot analysis was used to assist in deployment strategies.  Hot spot analysis is a statistical technique used to identify incidents that are concentrated within geographical areas over time.  Identifying crime hot spots and analyzing both neighbourhood and crime characteristics within these areas are thought to be critical pieces of information for fighting crimes.

Mounted patrol

The mounted patrol unit (MPU) was formed in September 2009 and consists of five horses and six officers. 
The priorities of the MPU are to heighten the service’s ability to accomplish:

crime prevention
manage entertainment districts
conduct search and rescue
provide park and trail safety
public safety during large scale festivals and events, protests and demonstrations

MPU offers coverage throughout the city of Hamilton with rotating day, afternoon and night shifts.

Marine

The marine unit began as the Hamilton Harbour Police in 1921. It had a division called the rescue and patrol unit which was responsible for all on-the-water activities.  A shore patrol was created in 1938 to deal with on-shore situations.  Both units together would be responsible to patrol the entire Hamilton Harbour area of Lake Ontario.  The two units were amalgamated in 1969 and remained that way until 1986, when the Hamilton Harbour Commission disbanded the harbour police. After that, the responsibility for policing the harbour became the responsibility of the Hamilton-Wentworth Regional Police Service.

The boundaries of responsibility increased in 1996 when the Halton Regional Police Service joined forces with the Hamilton Wentworth Regional Police Marine Unit in order to provide a more complete service. This agreement ended in April 2008 when Halton moved their marine operations to Bronte Harbour.

The Hamilton Police Service Marine Unit operate a four-man full-time marine and carry four "spare" officers for vacation coverage and emergencies. they patrol Hamilton Harbour and the western end of Lake Ontario. Hamilton Harbour is the largest Canadian port on the Great Lakes. The marine unit actively patrols from mid-April until mid-November. In the off-season they perform ice rescue and traffic enforcement.

The unit operates a 32' aluminium patrol boat built by Hike Metal Products. In the beginning of 2016, they added to their fleet a 28' Zodiac Pro 870 RHIB (rigid-hulled inflatable boat). It is equipped with twin supercharged 300 hp Mercury Verado motors. They also have an ARGO (ATV manufacturer) amphibious vehicle.  The unit gained fame in April 2011 when they rescued a group of highschool rowers who were caught in a freak storm. The members received the Canadian Safe Boating Counsel "Rescue of the Year" award. The first time this award was given to a professional organization.

Auxiliary police unit

The auxiliary police were established in the early 1960s as a response to societal changes. Civil unrest throughout the world had the police service question its ability to deal with large-scale chaos.  The principal goal was to create an auxiliary force made up of volunteer, unpaid officers who could be called upon to assist the regular force if problems were ever to arise.  The auxiliary police are required to go through various training seminars, as well as maintain a high degree of physical fitness.  Although in uniform, they function under very strict guidelines and do not substitute for regular officers.  Instead, they assist in the processes when constables required a large, organized support.

The auxiliary police work at parades or during long weekends, at rallies, or large events where police presence is required on a larger scale than usual.  They are identified with a shoulder flash that says 'auxiliary'.  They also wear a traditional light-blue shirt whereas sworn officers wear navy blue uniforms.

Fleet
Police cars, also known as police cruisers are the most common vehicle used by the Hamilton Police Service. The vehicles are numbered in regards to their division and car number. For example, 710-1 represents that the vehicle is from division 1 (central), and the preceding 710 is the vehicle designation number.  Vehicles assigned to uniformed patrol begin with a 7 for a car and a 6 for a sport utility vehicle.  Specialty units such as ERU and canine begin with a 9.

Motor vehicles

Support vehicles

Marine unit vessels

Aircraft

Bicycles

Weapons

In the 1990s, the majority of law enforcement agencies of Canada began wearing bulletproof vests and municipal police agencies started carrying semi-automatic handguns in the 9mm or .40 S&W calibre cartridge. The Hamilton Police carry  Glock 22 handguns with hollow-point .40 S&W calibre ammunition.

These firearms replaced the aging .38 Special revolver. A police cruiser might carry a Remington Model 870 shotgun capable of firing a variety of shotgun shells.  In 2018 patrol officers began carrying carbine rifles.

Other less-lethal weapons carried include conducted electroshock weapons, pepper spray, and  expandable batons. In addition, the personal equipment of police officers typically includes: handcuffs, flashlights, portable radios, notebooks, and a pair of disposable gloves and Kevlar gloves.

The emergency response unit (ERU) members are issued Glock handguns with 9 mm calibre ammunition.  They also use a variety of less-lethal weapons such as flexible baton rounds. Other weapons that have been used by ERU include:

 Tikka T3 .308
 Sako TRG .308 sniper rifle
 37 mm flare gas gun
 Ruger Mini-14 RETIRED
 Steyr AUG assault rifle RETIRED
 MP5A3 9 mm submachine gun RETIRED
 Remington 870 shotgun
 Remington Model 770 rifle
 Diemaco C8 carbine
 Taser International M18 taser
 Taser International X26 taser
 Pepper spray (OC spray)
 Tear gas (CS gas)
 Rubber bullets or bean bags rounds
 ARWEN 37 37 mm riot gun (and AR-1 plastic baton rounds, may also be available to the public order unit (POU) for crowd/riot control)

See also
 Hamilton Fire Department
Hamilton Paramedic Service
Hamilton Police Pipe Band
Toronto Police Service
Brockville Police Service
Ontario Provincial Police
Royal Canadian Mounted Police
Royal Newfoundland Constabulary
 Lincoln Alexander (Honorary Police Chief)
 Integrated Security Unit
 Evelyn Dick
 Rocco Perri
 Musitano Crime Family

References

External links
 Hamilton Police Service Official website
 Hamilton Fire Department
 Hamilton Emergency Medical Services

Law enforcement agencies of Ontario
Municipal government of Hamilton, Ontario
1833 establishments in Upper Canada